Lobectomy means surgical excision of a lobe. This may refer to a lobe of the lung (also simply called a lobectomy), a lobe of the thyroid (hemithyroidectomy), a lobe of the brain (as in anterior temporal lobectomy), or a lobe of the liver (hepatectomy).


Lung lobectomy 
A lobectomy of the lung is performed in early-stage non-small cell lung cancer patients. It is not performed on patients that have lung cancer that has spread to other parts of the body. Tumor size, type, and location are major factors as to whether a lobectomy is performed. This can be due to cancer or smoking.  Lung lobectomies are performed on patients as young as eleven or twelve who have no cancer or smoking history, but have conditions from birth or early childhood that necessitate the operation. Such patients will have reduced lung capacity which tends to limit their range of activities through life.  They often need to use inhalers on a daily basis, and are often classified as being asthmatic.

References

External links 

Surgical procedures and techniques
Pulmonology